Kim Jeong-sun (born 8 July 1961) is a South Korean volleyball player. She competed in the women's tournament at the 1984 Summer Olympics.

References

1961 births
Living people
South Korean women's volleyball players
Olympic volleyball players of South Korea
Volleyball players at the 1984 Summer Olympics
Place of birth missing (living people)
Asian Games medalists in volleyball
Asian Games bronze medalists for South Korea
Volleyball players at the 1982 Asian Games
Volleyball players at the 1986 Asian Games
Medalists at the 1982 Asian Games
Medalists at the 1986 Asian Games